Simshar is a 2014 Maltese drama film directed by Rebecca Cremona. It was selected as the Maltese entry for the Best Foreign Language Film at the 87th Academy Awards, but was not nominated. It was the first time that Malta submitted a film for the Best Foreign Language Oscar. The film tells the story of the Simshar incident.

During 2015 and 2016, Simshar entered the global festival circuit, collecting several awards including the Special Achievement Award at the International Filmfestival Mannheim-Heidelberg and Best International Feature at Edmonton International Film Festival. In 2015 Gravitas Ventures (US) obtained the worldwide distribution rights for the film including for VOD platforms.

Cast
 Lotfi Abdelli as Simon
 Jimi Busuttil as Karmenu
 Sékouba Doucouré as Moussa
 Chrysander Agius as John
 Adrian Farrugia as Theo
 Clare Agius as Sharin
 Mark Mifsud as Alex

See also
 List of submissions to the 87th Academy Awards for Best Foreign Language Film
 List of Maltese submissions for the Academy Award for Best Foreign Language Film

References

External links
 

2014 films
2014 drama films
Maltese drama films
Maltese-language films
Drama films based on actual events
Films about immigration
Films shot in Malta
Films set in Malta
Films set in 2008